The Marietta Band of Nooksacks are an unrecognized group of Nooksack people in Whatcom County, Washington.

They are not part of the federally recognized tribe known as the Nooksack, who are based in Whatcom County. They have a nearly 3200-acre land base, much of it held by the federal government as trust land.

See also
Marietta, Washington
List of unrecognized tribes in the United States

References

Whatcom County, Washington
Native American tribes in Washington (state)